Jategaon is a village in the Karmala taluka of Solapur district in Maharashtra state, India.

Demographics
Covering  and comprising 445 households at the time of the 2011 census of India, Jategaon had a population of 2208. There were 1164 males and 1044 females, with 295 people being aged six or younger.

References

Villages in Karmala taluka